Jefferies House, also known as the Jolly House, is a historic home located at Gaffney, Cherokee County, South Carolina. It was built in 1884, and is a two-story, frame, Italianate style dwelling.  It is asymmetrical and features a large one-story porch on the main façade and a two-tiered porch on the right elevation.  Also on the main façade is a one-story square bay window with decorative brackets. It is one of the oldest and most significant residences remaining in Gaffney.

It was listed in the National Register of Historic Places in 1986.

References

Houses on the National Register of Historic Places in South Carolina
Italianate architecture in South Carolina
Houses completed in 1884
Houses in Cherokee County, South Carolina
National Register of Historic Places in Cherokee County, South Carolina
Gaffney, South Carolina